Ever since 1970, the Social Democrats had held the mayor's position in the municipality. In the previous 3 elections, they had also won an absolute majority.

Ole Bjørstorp who had become mayor following the 2017 election, would not stand for re-election as a Social Democrat. In February 2021 he had started a new party called Ishøjlisten, after the Social Democrats told him that he would not be their mayoral candidate for this election.  

In the election, the Social Democrats would lose it's absolute majority. However they would still be able to win the mayor's position, after an agreement between the Conservatives, Green Left, Venstre and the Red–Green Alliance was reached.

Electoral system
For elections to Danish municipalities, a number varying from 9 to 31 are chosen to be elected to the municipal council. The seats are then allocated using the D'Hondt method and a closed list proportional representation.
Ishøj Municipality had 19 seats in 2021

Unlike in Danish General Elections, in elections to municipal councils, electoral alliances are allowed.

Electoral alliances  

Electoral Alliance 1

Electoral Alliance 2

Electoral Alliance 3

Results

Notes

References 

Ishøj